1957 in sports describes the year's events in world sport.

American football
 NFL Championship: the Detroit Lions won 59–14 over the Cleveland Browns at Briggs Stadium
 1957 college football season:
The Auburn Tigers are voted national champions by the AP Poll; do not play in a bowl game on January 1, 1958, due to sanctions

Association football
 European Cup – Real Madrid beat Fiorentina 2–0.

England
 First Division – Manchester United win the 1956–57 title.
 FA Cup – Aston Villa beat Manchester United 2–1.
 May 15 – Stanley Matthews makes his last England appearance.

Other events
 February 8 – The Confederation of African Football is founded in Khartoum.

Australian rules football
 June 1 – East Perth kick a score of 3.30 (48) in wet conditions against Swan Districts’ 5.11 (41). It is the most inaccurate score in senior Australian Rules football history with 27 more behinds than goals.
 August 17 – By beating Essendon by 21 points, Hawthorn secure their first finals position in senior VFL football, which they joined in 1925. It is the longest finals absence in major Australian sporting history.
 August 31 – Hawthorn beat Carlton 10.11 (71) to 6.12 (48) in their first senior VFL final. It is the first time Hawthorn had finished above the Blues in their 33 years in the League.
 September 7 – West Perth 12.10 (82) draw with South Fremantle 13.4 (82) for the first senior WANFL drawn match since June 29, 1946, when the Cardinals drew with Swan Districts. The 948-game gap between constitutes the longest non-occurrence of draws in a major Australian Rules competition.
 September 21 – Melbourne 17.14 (116) beat Essendon 7.13 (55) in the VFL Grand Final. It is their third successive premiership, a feat not equalled until the Brisbane Lions in 2003.
 September 28 – Port Adelaide win their fourth successive SANFL premiership, beating Norwood 15.15 (105) to 13.16 (94).
 October 12 – East Fremantle beat East Perth 10.18 (78) to 9.8 (62) in the WANFL Grand Final for their eighteenth senior WANFL premiership, though their first since the unbeaten season of 1946.

Bandy

Baseball
 January 5 – Jackie Robinson retires rather than move across town from the Dodgers to the Giants, to whom he had been traded in December.
 Roy Sievers lead American league with 42 home runs and 114 RBIs, for the last place Washington Senators.
 Cy Young Award – Warren Spahn, Milwaukee Braves
 World Series – Milwaukee Braves defeat the New York Yankees four games to three.
 May 3 – Walter O'Malley, the owner of the Brooklyn Dodgers, agrees to move the team from Brooklyn, New York, to Los Angeles, California.
 August 19- Horace Stoneham announces that the Giants are moving from New York to San Francisco, California.
 October 8 – Walter O'Malley announces that the Dodgers are going to move from Brooklyn, New York, to Los Angeles, California.
 The Winnipeg Goldeyes win the Northern League championship.

Basketball
 NCAA Men's Division I Basketball Championship:
 North Carolina wins 54–53 over Kansas
 NBA Finals:
 Boston Celtics won 4 games to 3 over the St. Louis Hawks
 The tenth European basketball championship, Eurobasket 1957, is won by the Soviet Union.
 Spanish professional basketball league, Liga Espanola de Baloncesto (Spain Basketball League), a first game held on March 31.(as predecessor for Liga ACB)

Boxing
 September 23 – Carmen Basilio won the World Middleweight Championship by a 15-round decision over Sugar Ray Robinson.

Bowling
Nine-pin bowling
 Nine-pin bowling World Championships –
 Men's champion: Ion Micoroiu, Romania
 Women's champion: Gertrude Schmidka, Austria
 Men's team champion: Yugoslavia
 Women's team champion: Austria

Canadian football
 Grey Cup – Hamilton Tiger-Cats won 32–7 over the Winnipeg Blue Bombers

Cycling
 Giro d'Italia won by Gastone Nencini of Italy
 Tour de France – Jacques Anquetil of France
 UCI Road World Championships – Men's road race – Rik Van Steenbergen of Belgium

Figure skating
 World Figure Skating Championships:
 Men's champion: David Jenkins, United States
 Ladies' champion: Carol Heiss, United States
 Pair skating champions: Barbara Wagner & Robert Paul, Canada
 Ice dancing champions: June Markham & Courtney Jones, Great Britain

Golf
Men's professional
 Masters Tournament – Doug Ford
 U.S. Open – Dick Mayer
 British Open – Bobby Locke
 PGA Championship – Lionel Hebert
 PGA Tour money leader – Dick Mayer – $65,835
 Ryder Cup – Britain wins 7½ to 4½ over the United States in team golf.
Men's amateur
 British Amateur – Reid Jack
 U.S. Amateur – Hillman Robbins
Women's professional
 Women's Western Open – Patty Berg
 LPGA Championship – Louise Suggs
 U.S. Women's Open – Betsy Rawls
 Titleholders Championship – Patty Berg
 LPGA Tour money leader – Patty Berg – $16,272

Harness racing
 United States Pacing Triple Crown races:
 Cane Pace – Torpid
 Little Brown Jug – Torpid
 Messenger Stakes – Meadow Lands
 United States Trotting Triple Crown races:
 Hambletonian – Hickory Smoke
 Yonkers Trot – Hoot Song
 Kentucky Futurity – Cassin Hanover
 Australian Inter Dominion Harness Racing Championship:
 Pacers: Radiant Venture

Horse racing
Steeplechases
 Cheltenham Gold Cup – Linwell
 Grand National – Sundew
Flat races
 Australia – Melbourne Cup won by Straight Draw
 Canada – Queen's Plate won by Lyford Cay
 France – Prix de l'Arc de Triomphe won by Oroso
 Ireland – Irish Derby Stakes won by Ballymoss
 English Triple Crown Races:
 2,000 Guineas Stakes – Crepello
 The Derby – Crepello
 St. Leger Stakes – Ballymoss
 United States Triple Crown Races:
 May 4 – Kentucky Derby – Iron Liege
 Preakness Stakes – Bold Ruler
 Belmont Stakes – Gallant Man

Ice hockey
 Art Ross Trophy as the NHL's leading scorer during the regular season: Gordie Howe, Detroit Red Wings
 Hart Memorial Trophy for the NHL's Most Valuable Player: Gordie Howe, Detroit Red Wings
 Stanley Cup – Montreal Canadiens win 4 games to 1 over the Boston Bruins
 World Hockey Championship
 Men's champion: Sweden defeated the Soviet Union
 NCAA Men's Ice Hockey Championship – Colorado College Tigers defeat University of Michigan Wolverines 13–6 in Colorado Springs, Colorado

Motorsport

Rugby league
1957 New Zealand rugby league season
1957 NSWRFL season
1956–57 Northern Rugby Football League season / 1957–58 Northern Rugby Football League season
1957 Rugby League World Cup

Rugby union
 63rd Five Nations Championship series is won by England who complete the Grand Slam

Snooker
 World Snooker Championship – John Pulman beats Jackie Rea 39-34

Swimming
 January 31 – death in a road accident of John Marshall (26), Australian Olympic freestyle swimmer

Tennis
Australia
 Australian Men's Singles Championship – Ashley Cooper (Australia) defeats Neale Fraser (Australia) 6–3, 9–11, 6–4, 6–2
 Australian Women's Singles Championship – Shirley Fry Irvin (USA) defeats Althea Gibson (USA) 6–3, 6–4
England
 Wimbledon Men's Singles Championship – Lew Hoad (Australia) defeats Ashley Cooper (Australia) 6–2, 6–1, 6–2
 Wimbledon Women's Singles Championship – Althea Gibson (USA) defeats Darlene Hard (USA) 6–3, 6–2
France
 French Men's Singles Championship – Sven Davidson (Sweden) defeats Herbert Flam (USA) 6–3, 6–4, 6–4
 French Women's Singles Championship – Shirley Bloomer (Great Britain) defeats Dorothy Head Knode 6–1, 6–3
USA
 American Men's Singles Championship – Malcolm Anderson (Australia) defeats Ashley Cooper (Australia) 10–8, 7–5, 6–4
 American Women's Singles Championship – Althea Gibson (USA) defeats Louise Brough (USA) 6–3, 6–2
Events
 Althea Gibson becomes the first black player to win a Wimbledon singles championship
Davis Cup
 1957 Davis Cup –  3–2  at Kooyong Stadium (grass) Melbourne, Australia

Multi-sport events
 Pan Arab Games held in Beirut, Lebanon

Awards
 Associated Press Male Athlete of the Year – Ted Williams, Major League Baseball
 Associated Press Female Athlete of the Year – Althea Gibson, Tennis

References

 
Sports by year